Sanguisorbinae is a subtribe of flowering plants in the rose family, Rosaceae. It is the sister to subtribe Agrimoniinae in tribe Sanguisorbeae.

References

 
Sanguisorbeae
Plant subtribes